Pakanadu is a region in the Indian state of Andhra Pradesh. It is spread over the districts of Kadapa, Nellore and southern Prakasam. The coastal areas lying between Nellore and Krishna are also part of this region.

References 

Sub regions of Andhra Pradesh
Coastal Andhra
Geography of Kadapa district
Geography of Nellore district